Liselotte Pulver (born 11 October 1929), sometimes credited as Lilo Pulver, is a Swiss actress. Pulver was one of the biggest stars of German cinema in the 1950s and 1960s, where she often was cast as a tomboy. She is well known for her hearty and joyful laughter. Her films outside of German cinema include A Time to Love and a Time to Die (1958), One, Two, Three (1961) and The Nun (1966).

Early life
Pulver was born in Bern to civil engineer Fritz Eugen Pulver and his wife Germaine. From 1945 on Pulver attended commercial school. After graduating in 1948, she worked as a model and took acting classes at the Bern conservatory, now part of the Bern University of Applied Sciences. Following small parts at the Bern Theatre (Stadttheater Bern), she appeared at the Schauspielhaus Zürich.

Film career 
Pulver's first film role was in the 1949 American-Swiss co-production Swiss Tour. Her breakthrough movie role was "Vreneli", the wife of the lead in Uli, der Knecht (1954), made after the novel of Swiss author Jeremias Gotthelf. Pulver became one of the biggest stars of German-language cinema in the 1950s and 1960s, often nicknamed "Lilo" Pulver. She was very often seen in comedies, most notably I Often Think of Piroschka (1954), The Zürich Engagement (1957), The Spessart Inn (1958) and Kohlhiesel's Daughters (1962). One of her more serious film roles was as Tony Buddenbrook in The Buddenbrooks (1959), a cinema adaption of Thomas Mann's novel of the same name. She also appeared in another Thomas Mann adaption, Confessions of Felix Krull (1957) with Horst Buchholz in the title role of a charming and narcissistic conman.

In the late 1950s and 1960s, Pulver was involved in a number of American and French film productions. Her first Hollywood film was Douglas Sirk's war melodrama A Time to Love and a Time to Die (1958), in which she and John Gavin played a young German couple whose happiness is doomed at the end of the Second World War. She was James Cagney's attractive secretary "Fräulein Ingeborg" in Billy Wilder's comedy One, Two, Three (1961). In 1963, for her role as a Russian woman in A Global Affair, she was nominated for a Golden Globe Award as best supporting actress. In France, she appeared alongside Anna Karina in Jacques Rivette's film The Nun (1966).

In the 1970s, she increasingly turned towards television roles. From 1978 until 1983 she worked for the German edition of Sesame Street, Sesamstraße. Her last film credit was in 2007, when she played a cameo role in Die Zürcher Verlobung, a remake of The Zürich Engagement. She made a public appearance at the 2018 Bambi Awards, where she accepted a prize for Honorary Achievement.

Personal life 

In 1960, she met German actor Helmut Schmid on the set of Gustav Adolf's Page: they married on 9 September 1961 and had two children. Her daughter committed suicide in 1989. Her husband died in 1992 of a heart attack.

Awards
 1963, 1964, 1965, 1967, 1968, 1990, 2018: Bambi Award (in 2018 for livetime achievement)
 1963: Golden Globe Award nomination as best supporting actress for A Global Affair
 1986: Order of Merit of the Federal Republic of Germany
 1999: Bavarian Film Awards Honorary Award
 2007: Goldene Kamera for Livetime Achievement

Partial filmography

References

External links

 
 Photographs of Liselotte Pulver

1929 births
Living people
People from Bern
Swiss stage actresses
Officers Crosses of the Order of Merit of the Federal Republic of Germany
Best Actress German Film Award winners
Swiss film actresses
Swiss television actresses
20th-century Swiss actresses